Professor Jayantha Lal Ratnasekera is a Sri Lankan academic. He serves as Vice Chancellor of Uva Wellassa University of Sri Lanka.

Early life 
Ratnasekera's primary education came at Agrabodhi Vidyalaya, Kanthale, and his secondary education at Nalanda College, Colombo, (1972-1980). He graduated from Peoples' Friendship University of Russia, with an honors degree in chemistry in 1988. In 1993 he earned his PhD in Chemistry there.

Career 
Ratnasekera joined Rajarata University of Sri Lanka as a Senior Lecturer in August 1996, and was promoted to Professor in Chemistry in 2018. He served as Head of the Department of Physical Sciences from 1996 to 1999, and as Dean of Faculty of Applied Sciences from 1999 to 2005.

Ratnasekera was appointed to the Post of Vice Chancellor of Uva Wellassa University of Sri Lanka in January, 2017. He has served as the Chair of the Committee of Vice Chancellors & Directors (CVCD), during 2021.

His research interests are in renewable energy sources, environmental chemistry, theoretical chemistry, quality assurance in higher education, and science education.  Ratnasekera has been a trainer and a resource in numerous training programs and workshops. He is well known as a freelance journalist, author and translator.

References

External links 
 Professor Jayantha Lal Ratnasekera was re-appointed as the Vice- Chancellor of Uva Wellassa University
 Pathikada, 19.08.2020 Asoka Dias interviews Prof. Jayantha Lal Ratnasekera, Vice Chancellor, UWU
 NALANDIANS’ TRIBUTE TO THE COMMANDER OF THE AIR FORCE

Sri Lankan Buddhists
Sinhalese academics
Alumni of Nalanda College, Colombo
Living people
1962 births